Coello is a town and municipality in the Tolima Department of Colombia, located by the Magdalena River, and some 137 km from the Colombian capital Bogotá. The town was founded in 1600.

Tourism

Coello River
Salto de lucha
Casa de la Cultura

External links
 Coello official website

Municipalities of Tolima Department